North Carolina Highway 81 (NC 81) is a primary state highway in the U.S. state of North Carolina. That runs entirely in Asheville and Buncombe County from US 25 to US 70.

Route Description

NC 81 begins at the intersection of All Souls Crescent (US 25 north), Hendersonville Road (US 25 south), and Vanderbilt Road in Historic Biltmore Village. Immediately after crossing the Swannanoa River, it turns eastward on Swannanoa River Road, which closely tracks the path of the Swannanoa River. Westbound lanes of NC 81, however, are routed for  via Bryson Street, which intersects Biltmore Avenue one block north of Swannanoa River Road. After  NC 81 intersects US 74A (South Tunnel Road) near the Asheville Mall. It runs concurrent with US 74A for  before US 74A turns southward onto Fairview Road. NC 81 continues to follow the Swannanoa River for another  and then turns to the northward, ultimately terminating at US 70 (Tunnel Road) in Asheville's Oteen neighborhood.

History
NC 81 was designated in 1934 as a renumbering of NC 10 from US 25 (current Biltmore Avenue) to US 70/US 74 (current US 74A). The road was then extended in 1937 when US 25 was rerouted in Asheville. NC 81 was placed south along Biltmore Avenue to the current end of the road at the intersection of US 25 and US 25A. Then in 1938 the road was extended to its current terminus at US 70.

Major intersections

References

External links

 NCRoads.com: N.C. 81

081
Transportation in Buncombe County, North Carolina